Eragrostis kuschelii is a species of flowering plant in the family Poaceae, endemic to the Desventuradas Islands (San Ambrosio island). It was first described by Carl Skottsberg in 1963.

References

kuschelii
Flora of the Desventuradas Islands
Plants described in 1963